Macon Township may refer to:
Macon Township, Bureau County, Illinois
Macon Township, Harvey County, Kansas
Macon Township, Michigan
Macon Township, Franklin County, Nebraska

Township name disambiguation pages